HTMS Sri Ayudhya was a coastal defence ship of the Royal Thai Navy. It was in service from 1938 to 1951, being active during the Franco-Thai war in which its sister ship  was heavily damaged in the Battle of Ko Chang. Sri Ayudhya later served as flagship of the navy until it was sunk as a result of fighting in the Manhattan Rebellion.

Construction and career
In the 1930s the Royal Siamese Navy pursued plans to upgrade and expand its limited forces. This was approved by parliament in 1935, and 18 million baht was allocated for the procurement of new equipment. In December 1935, the navy contracted the Japanese Kawasaki Shipbuilding Corporation of Kobe to build two coastal defence ships for 5.727 million baht. Sri Ayudhya was delivered on 16 June 1938 and commissioned on 19 July; its sister ship  followed in October that year.

When the Franco-Thai war broke out in late 1940, the navy assigned Sri Ayudhya and Thonburi to the First Squadron, tasked with patrolling the eastern waters against potential French attacks. On the night of 14 January, the group led by Thonburi set sail from Sattahip Naval Base to relieve Sri Ayudhya and its convoy, which had been stationed at the island of Ko Chang in Trat Province. They rendezvoused the following morning, and the Sri Ayudhya group returned to Sattahip. Two days later, at dawn on 17 January, Thonburi and other ships in the group were engaged by French naval forces in what became the Battle of Ko Chang. Sri Ayudhya was sent to assist in the battle, but only arrived in the afternoon after hostilities had ceased. However, some French reports erroneously noted that Sri Ayudhya was damaged by a torpedo during the battle.

Sri Ayudhya did not see action after World War II, although it became regarded as the flagship of the navy. It served as a royal transport vessel for Kings Ananda Mahidol and Bhumibol Adulyadej during the final legs of their respective return trips from Switzerland in 1938 and 1950.

Manhattan Rebellion

On 29 June 1951, in a coup attempt known as the Manhattan Rebellion, a group of junior naval officers held Prime Minister Plaek Pibulsonggram (Phibun) at gunpoint during a boat-transfer ceremony at Ratchaworadit Pier on the Chao Phraya River in Bangkok. Phibun was taken aboard the Sri Ayudhya and held hostage. General stations were called, and the ship began to make way downstream towards the Naval Ordnance Department in Bang Na. However, the coup plotters failed to secure the opening of the Memorial Bridge, and the ship thus could not continue. Fighting quickly ensued, and the naval units that sided with the rebels became heavily outnumbered by the army, police and air forces, who were loyal to the government. Fighting subsided during the night but resumed and intensified early the next morning. Sri Ayudhya joined the fight, but its engines were soon disabled and the ship became dead in the water in front of Wichaiprasit Fort. It was heavily fired upon from the eastern bank by guns and mortars, and, by afternoon, was also bombarded by AT-6 trainer planes. Heavy fires broke out, and the order was given to abandon ship. Phibun had to swim ashore along with the sailors, but was uninjured. The fires continued throughout the night and into the next day, when fighting ceased. The heavily damaged Sri Ayudhya finally sank in the night of 1 July.

The wreck of Sri Ayudhya was later salvaged for scrap, as it had become a navigational hazard. The ship was officially struck from the naval register on 8 October 1959 in Ministerial Order 350/21315.

Notes

References 

Coastal defence ships of the Royal Thai Navy
Ships built by Kawasaki Heavy Industries
1937 ships
Japan–Thailand military relations
Maritime incidents in 1951
Ships sunk by aircraft
World War II coastal defence ships